Bangladesh Railway Museum is the sole railway museum of Bangladesh Railway located in Chattogram, Bangladesh.

It was a bungalow before it was turned to a museum on 15 November 2003, which showcases some of the rich collection of relics, objects used in Assam Bengal Railway (1942), Eastern Bengal Railway (1947) and Pakistan Railways (1961). The preserved artefacts mainly belong to mechanical, electrical, telecommunication, signal, traffic and engineering departments of the Bangladesh Railway. It also includes different kinds of lamps and lights, fans and bells, uniforms and accessories of station masters, signalling equipment, transmitters, analogue telephone, monograms, track switches and railway sleepers.

Location
The museum is located on a land of 12-acre atop a hillock opposite Bangladesh Railway Carriage and Wagon Workshop at Ambagan, Pahartali.

References

External links

 BR Official site

Museums established in 2003
Bangladesh Railway
Museums in Chittagong
Tourist attractions in Chittagong Division